El Llano Béisbol Club (El Llano Baseball Club in English language) is a baseball and softball team in the Spanish baseball league. Founded in 1986, the club is based at the El LLano, a neighbourhood of the city of Gijón in Asturias.

History
The team has been competing at the top level of the Spanish leagues, the División de Honor, since 2002, when they promoted from Primera División A, except for the 2011 season, when they played at the Primera División A  again.

Best performances were turned out in 2008, when they placed 4th overall and won the King's Cup (Copa del Rey).

After being relegated to Primera División A in 2010, El Llano came back immediately to División de Honor, where it played from 2012 and 2014, when the club resigned to the category due to the financial trouble of the last years.

In 2018, El Llano created the softball section and started competing by playing the Liga Ibérica, a friendly tournament played with teams from Spain and Portugal.

Trophies
Copa del Rey: 1
2008

Season by season

References

External links
Official Website

Baseball teams in Spain
Sport in Gijón
Sports teams in Asturias